The 2014 Notre Dame Fighting Irish men's soccer team will represent the University of Notre Dame during the 2014 NCAA Division I men's soccer season. The Irish enter the season as the defending national champions.

2014 squad

Standings

Schedule 

Not released

See also 

 Notre Dame Fighting Irish men's soccer
 2014 Atlantic Coast Conference men's soccer season
 2014 NCAA Division I men's soccer season
 2014 ACC Men's Soccer Tournament
 2014 NCAA Division I Men's Soccer Championship

References 

Notre Dame Fighting Irish
Notre Dame Fighting Irish men's soccer seasons
Notre Dame Fighting Irish
Notre Dame Fighting Irish